This is a list of United States Air Force test squadrons. It covers units considered to be part of the Air Force and serves as a break out of the comprehensive List of United States Air Force squadrons. Most units in this list are assigned to Air Force Materiel Command, however, a few reside in other Major Commands of the United States Air Force.

Flight Test Squadrons

See also 
 List of United States Air Force squadrons

Test
 Test